Keng-Suu Game Reserve is a specially protected area located in Tüp District of Issyk-Kul Region of Kyrgyzstan. It was established in 1990 to conserve and reproduce game animals including those listed in the Red Book.  The game reserve's area is 8,712 hectares.

References
 

Game reserves in Kyrgyzstan
Protected areas established in 1990